Statistics of Division 2 in the 1964–65 season.

Overview
It was contested by 16 teams, and OGC Nice won the championship.

League standings

References
France - List of final tables (RSSSF)

Ligue 2 seasons
French
2